GCC commonly refers to:
 Gulf Cooperation Council, an organization of Arab states
 GNU Compiler Collection, a free and open-source cross-platform compiler

GCC may also refer to:

Education
 Good Counsel College, Innisfail, Queensland, Australia
 Greenwich Community College, England
 Gazipur Cantonment College, Bangladesh	
 Grace Christian College, Quezon City, Philippines
 Galahitiyawa Central College, Ganemulla, Sri Lanka

Canada
 Garden City Collegiate, a high school in Winnipeg, Manitoba
 Grenville Christian College, near Brockville, Ontario

United States
 Genesee Community College, Batavia, New York
 Germanna Community College, Virginia
 Gila Community College, Arizona
 Girls Catholic Central High School, in Detroit, Michigan
 Glendale Community College (Arizona)
 Glendale Community College (California)
 Gloucester County College, former name of Rowan College at Gloucester County, New Jersey
 Gogebic Community College, Michigan
 Greenfield Community College (Massachusetts)
 Greensburg Central Catholic High School, Pennsylvania
 Grove City College, a private college in Pennsylvania
 Guam Community College, Guam

Organizations
 Gauhati Cine Club, a film society in Assam
Grand Challenges Canada, a Canadian non-profit organization
 Global China Connection, a student-run non-profit organization

Companies
 Gene Codes Corporation, a bioinformatics software company
 General Cinema Corporation, a former theater chain acquired by AMC Theatres
 General Computer Corporation, a computer printer manufacturer, formerly a video-game producer
 Ghirardelli Chocolate Company, a US chocolate company

Government and politics
 , the Canadian Coast Guard
 Gazipur City Corporation, one of the city corporations in Bangladesh
 General Chiropractic Council, regulatory body for chiropractic in the UK
 Georgia Cryptologic Center, a US National Security Agency facility in Augusta, Georgia
 Glasgow City Council, United Kingdom
 Global Climate Coalition, a defunct grouping of businesses opposing action on climate change
 Global Certification Commission, an independent body of the World Health Organisation for the eradication of wild polio
 Grand Council of the Crees (GCC(EI)), Canada
 Graphic Communications Conference, an American trade union
 Great Council of Chiefs, a former constitutional body in Fiji
 Greater Chennai Corporation, civic body that governs the city of Chennai in India.

Religion
 Gateway Community Church, Baguio City, Philippines
 Georgia-Cumberland Conference of Seventh-day Adventists, or Georgia-Cumberland Conference, US
 Grace Community Church, California, US
 Granger Community Church, Indiana, US
 Great Commission Churches, Ohio, US

Sport
 Glenorchy Cricket Club, Tasmania, Australia
 Godalming Cricket Club, Surrey, England
 Golden Coast Conference, an American collegiate water polo conference
 Goodwood Cricket Club, Chichester, England
 Greater Cleveland Conference, Ohio, US	
 Gulf Coast Conference, a defunct NCAA college athletic conference

Science and technology
 General communication channel, in computer networking
 Global carbon cycle, the biogeochemical cycle by which carbon is exchanged

 Guanylyl cyclase c, an enzyme
 Gaussian correlation conjecture, a mathematical conjecture proved in 2014 by Thomas Royen
 GCC, a codon for the amino acid alanine

Other uses
 Gibbon Conservation Center, in Santa Clarita, California, US
 Gillette–Campbell County Airport (IATA and FAA LID codes), Wyoming, US
 Greensboro Coliseum Complex, an entertainment and sports complex in Greensboro, North Carolina, US
 Knight Grand Cross of the Royal Order of Cambodia
 Grand Cross of the Military Order of Christ
 Green-cheeked conure, a variety of parakeet

See also
 Greenfield Community College, Newton Aycliffe, England